Sergeant Cork is a British detective television series which first aired between 1963 and 1968 on ITV. It was a police procedural show that followed the efforts of two police officers and their battle against crime in Victorian London. In all 66 hour-long episodes were aired during the five-year run, although the last episode was not broadcast until January 1968, 16 months after the others. Journalist Tom Sutcliffe has credited it as a first example of the use of the Victorian-era policeman in a television crime series.

A 1969 review in The Age opined that rather than suspense, the strengths of the series were its "[e]xcellent period settings and wonderfully thick pea-soupers" which "add up to splendid evocative stuff", as well as the performance of star John Barrie.

At no time during the whole series is Sergeant Cork's first name given.

Cast
 John Barrie as Sergeant Cork
 William Gaunt as Robert 'Bob' Marriott
 Charles Morgan as Superintendent Rodway
 Arnold Diamond as Detective Joseph Bird
 John Richmond as Superintendent Billy Nelson
  Freddy Fowler as Chalky White

Other actors appearing in two or more episodes included:
 Carmen Silvera
 Alan Haines

DVD Releases
Network has released the entire series on Region 2, PAL DVD in the UK. The second series was an exclusive two-disc set on their website which has since been re-released on 3 September 2012.  The third set was also a four disc set and is available through the Network website. Series 4 became available from both the Network website and other retailers on 6 August 2012. Series 5 was released on 19 November 2012, and Series 6 on 18 March 2013.

References

1963 British television series debuts
1966 British television series endings
1960s British drama television series
1960s British crime television series
ITV television dramas
Television shows set in London
Detective television series
Television shows produced by Associated Television (ATV)
Black-and-white British television shows
English-language television shows
Television shows shot at ATV Elstree Studios